King Zhao of Yan (died 279 BC), ancestral name Jī (姬), clan name Yān (燕), personal name Zhí (職), was the fourth king of the state of Yan in Warring States period of Chinese history. He ruled the kingdom between 311 BC until his death in 279 BC.

Zhí was a son of Kuai, King of Yan. In early years, he was chosen to serve as a political hostage in the Kingdom of Han.

In 314 BC, Yan was attacked and practically conquered by Qi, both Kuai and the usurper Zizhi (子之) were killed. However, Qi was unable to put down the rebellion in Yan area and had to withdraw. Finally, the Yan Kingdom was restored. Zhí was installed as the new king by King Wuling of Zhao, and sent back to Yan.

King Zhao was judicious and measured in his actions toward his subordinates. He hired talents with high salary, these talents include: Yue Yi from Wei, Zou Yan (鄒衍) from Qi, and Ju Xin (劇辛) from Zhao. Yan became a powerful kingdom and was able to take revenge on Qi. In 284, he plotted with the states of Zhao, Qin, Han and Wei for a joint expedition against Qi. Led by the brilliant general Yue Yi, seventy walled cities were taken by the joint expedition, with the exception of Jimo (即墨) and Ju (莒). King Zhao died in 279 BC, succeeded by his son King Hui of Yan.

References

Monarchs of Yan (state)
279 BC deaths
Chinese kings
Yan (state)
Zhou dynasty nobility
Year of birth unknown
4th-century BC Chinese monarchs
3rd-century BC Chinese monarchs